Prem Adda is an Indian Kannada-language action film. Prem, Meka Murali Krishna and Kriti Kharbanda are of the film. The film is directed by Mahesh Babu and the film music is scored by V. Harikrishna. The film is the  remake of  Tamil film Subramaniapuram. Prem is acting under another director for the first time in this movie.

Cast 

 Prem as Ranganatha
 Meka Murali Krishna as Seena
 Shiva Manju
 Adda Ramesh
 Kriti Kharbanda as Girija
 Chandrakala Mohan
 Patre Nagaraj
 Nagarajamurthy as Somanna
 Sathyajith
 Murali Mohan
 Sharan Kabbur
 S. Govind
 Lakshmi Siddayya
 Kaddipudi chandru
 Dharma
 Raju Talikote
 Malvalli Saikrishna
 Aindrita Ray as item number
 Scarlett Mellish Wilson as item number

Soundtrack 

The soundtrack of the album was released on 19 September 2012. Prem Adda consists of Six songs composed by V. Harikrishna. The song "Kangal Irandaal" from the original Tamil film was retained here as "Kalli Ivalu". All the songs are super hit in the market.

Reception

Critical response 

B. S. Srivani Deccan Herald wrote "Prem seems to enjoy his role while Kruti Kharbanda fills the eyes and heart. Coming close on the heels of Drama, Prem Adda passes by like a gust of wind full of dust". A critic from Bangalore Mirror wrote  "The story has enough stuff to keep the audience engaged. Be warned of the violence that has earned it an ‘A’ certificate. The music by Harikrishna and the cinematography by Arun Prasad are top class. We must add, it is no match for the original". A critic from DNA wrote "Well, just that Prem Adda does the very thing that Subramaniapuram stays away from... making criminals look like heroes. The makers would have done better to retain the flavour and intention of the original. So watch it for the performance of the lead pair if you must". A critic from The Times of India scored the film at 2.5 out of 5 stars and says "While Prem shows some improvement in acting over his first movie Preethi Yeke Bhoomi Melide, it’s better he wears a director’s hat. Muralikrishna impresses. Kriti Kharbanda could have done much better. Lakshmi, a TV artiste, has done a good job as our hero’s aunt. Music by V Harikrishna has a couple of good numbers". Srikanth Srinivasa from Rediff.com scored the film at 2.5 out of 5 stars and wrote "Debutant Arun D Prasad's cinematography is quite good; he is a good find. Mavalli Sai Krishna's dialogues are also quite apt. Mass Maada has shot the action sequences well although they are a bit gory. Prem Adda will entertain the masses who look for a rustic feel in films". A critic from India TV wrote "
"Prem Adda" is watchable for its huge presentation but the violence in the film may not be liked by the family audience". A Sharadhaa from The New Indian Express wrote "Cinematographer Arund D Prasad has captured the village scenes very well. Harikrishna has once again won many hearts with his melodious and peppy numbers. Verdict: The film may not be that pleasant as the love flick eventually turns into a movie with a lot of bloodshed".

References

External links 
 

2012 films
Kannada remakes of Tamil films
2010s Kannada-language films
Indian satirical films
Indian political satire films
Films scored by V. Harikrishna
Films directed by Mahesh Babu (director)